The Taipei Film Commission (TFC) is an organization based in Da'an District, Taipei, Taiwan.

History
The commission was established in 2007.

Transportation
The headquarters of the organization is accessible within walking distance east of Xinyi Anhe Station of Taipei Metro.

See also

 Cinema of Taiwan

References

External links
 
 

2007 establishments in Taiwan
Arts organizations established in 2007
Film organizations in Taiwan
Organizations based in Taipei